Touchstone may refer to:

 Touchstone (assaying tool), a stone used to identify precious metals
 Touchstone (metaphor), a means of assaying relative merits of a concept

Entertainment
 Touchstone (album), a 1982 album by Chick Corea
 Touchstone (band), rock group from the U.K.
 Touchstone (US-Irish band), Irish-music band from the U.S.
 The Touchstone (album), by British jazz trio Azimuth
 The Touchstone, a novella by Edith Wharton
 Touchstone (As You Like It), a fictional character in Shakespeare's As You Like It
 Touchstone (Garth Nix character), a fictional character from Garth Nix's Old Kingdom trilogy
 Touchstone (Stargate SG-1), an episode of the television series Stargate SG-1
 Touchstone (Syphon Filter), a character from the Syphon Filter games

Companies
 Touchstone Energy, an energy cooperative
 Touchstone Home Entertainment
 Touchstone Pictures, a film distribution label of Walt Disney Studios Motion Pictures
 Touchstone Semiconductor, a manufacturer
 TouchStone Software
 Touchstone Studios
 Touchstone Communication
 Touchstone Television, a television production company formerly called Fox 21 Television Studios
 Touchstone Television (1985–2007), former name of television production company ABC Signature
 Touchstone Books, an imprint of Simon & Schuster

Other
 Touchstone (horse) (1831–1861), thoroughbred racehorse
 Touchstone (magazine), a Christian journal
 Touchstone file, a network parameter data file
 Touchstone Memorial Award
 Touchstone Theatre, a professional theatre company in Vancouver, British Columbia, Canada
 Operation Touchstone, a series of 14 nuclear tests conducted at the Nevada Test Site in 1987 and 1988
 Touchstone, the brand name of the inductive charger for HP/Palm WebOS devices